Dragons of Flame is the second module in the first major story arc in the Dungeons & Dragons Dragonlance series of game modules.  It is one of the 14 Dragonlance adventures published by TSR between 1984 and 1986.  Its cover features a painting by Jeff Easley depicting Tasslehoff Burrfoot peering at a red dragon and Verminaard of the Dragonarmies of Ansalon.

Kapak Draconians make their debut in this module; Aghar and Baaz Draconians from Dragons of Despair return as featured creatures. The locations featured in this module are Qualinost and the Sla-Mori, a secret passage between Qualinesti and Pax Tharkas.

The same player characters (PCs) from Dragons of Despair are available again, with their character sheets reflecting that they have each increased a level from the previous adventure. Tika becomes a playable character at the end of chapter six, and Gilthanas, a new character, becomes playable at the end of chapter eight. Laurana, who becomes a playable character in DL6 Dragons of Ice, makes her debut in this module.

Plot synopsis
Continuing from the previous module, Dragons of Despair, players reenact the Dragonlance story using the pre-generated players. The player characters return to their hometown and find it overrun by evil; the elves of Qualinost hire them to free captives that the Draconians have imprisoned in the fortress of Pax Tharkas. In Dragons of Flame, the brave Innfellows are suffering thanks to the Draconians, and require aid in the beleaguered North Lands before setting off to rescue an enslaved population. When the adventure starts, Solace has been captured by Kapak Draconians.  The dragon armies control the plains, but Qualinesti is not conquered. Plainsmen are being taken by caravan to Pax Tharkas to be slaves.

Chapter 5 – Que Kiri and the Plains
A short set of encounters on the plains and the ruins of Que Kiri show the effects of the dragon armies as the PCs travel back to Solace from Xak Tsaroth, where they finished Dragons of Despair. There is also an encounter to ensure the PCs are captured and taken to Solace if they head in another direction.

Chapter 6 – Solace
The PCs see the devastation at Solace, and are arrested in the Inn of the Last Home along with Tika and Gilthanas.

Chapter 7 – The Slave Caravan
As slaves being transported to Pax Tharsis, the PCs meet Gilthanas, and are rescued by elves.

Chapter 8 – Elvenhome
The elves, polite but aloof, update the players on the start of the war and suggest that they and Gilthanas should free the slaves and hostages in Pax Tharsis. Laurana is introduced, and soon after is kidnapped by Fewmaster Toede.

Chapter 9 – To the  Walls of Pax Tharkas
The heroes and Gilthanas, who becomes a PC, travel overland for a day, then enter and traverse Sla-Mori, the secret passages that lead into the fortress of Pax Tharkas.

Chapter 10 – The Tharkadan Towers
In a section of Pax Tharkas, the heroes must find and rescue all the children, women, and men who are being held prisoner in different locations. Besides all the draconian or hobgoblin guards, they must avoid two ancient red dragons and dragon highlord Verminaard.

Publication history
DL2 Dragons of Flame was designed by Douglas Niles, et al., features art by Jeff Easley, and was published by TSR in 1984 as a thirty-two page booklet with an outer cover.

Reception
Rick Swan reviewed the adventure in The Space Gamer No. 73. He praised the module for its vivid and non-stereotypical characterizations, challenging and engaging encounters, and well-crafted storyline. He did note that: "The story is so tightly scripted that occasionally players may feel more like observers rather than participants", and cautions that Dungeon Masters (DMs) will need to stay alert to keep players on track. However, he concludes by stating that: "If you've given up on Dungeons & Dragons, Dragons of Flame is a great way to get reacquainted."

Steve Hampshire reviewed the module for Imagine magazine, giving it a positive review. He noted that DL2 retains many of DL1's strengths of detail, clarity and layout. However, Hampshire had a few reservations about DL2, notably that: "the players have to go along with the plot to make any sense of it at all." He felt that, given the lack of real freedom for players, keeping up interest might be a problem. He also thought DL2 to be fairly short and that it would make little sense outside of the DL series. However, he concluded his review by noting that: "as one of the series [...] it has 'Dallas' appeal."

In a review by Graham Staplehurst in the July 1985 issue of White Dwarf, the module was given a rating of 7 out of 10 overall.  The review contains suggestions for the DM on how to handle various rule changes and run this style of adventure, where the game is more restrictive than normal, to keep the players within the story. Staplehurst said: "anyone thinking of running the whole of the DragonLance saga should bear in mind the potentially confining feeling that is part and parcel of this series"; and "[I]t's debatable how close this is to the original concept of role-playing". He felt that while: "The players will have to adapt to fit the characters rather than the other way round ... the authors have tried to develop the characters in a realistic manner".  Staplehurst said the modules provide plenty of thrills once players settle into their roles, and opined that there are two ways of looking at these adventures: "They may be used by inexperienced players to get involved and experienced in the game (despite the fact that it is somewhat non-standard AD&D), or they represent a detailed world for players of long-standing to immerse themselves in." He felt that with around twenty-four pages of text, an area map, three detailed location maps, and plenty of good art, purchasers would get their money's worth, although he could not imagine anyone wanting to use certain repeated information and extras, such as a song and poem. Staplehurst concluded the review by noting that: [T]he players are treated as idiots if they do anything but the stated actions and though this may be a useful trick for less experienced players, it is extremely frustrating when DMing and players come up with a potentially intelligent suggestion or plan only to have to shoot it down because it 'doesn't fit the story'.  He felt that players should have been allowed more options from which to choose.

Adaptations
Dragons of Flame was adapted into a video game of the same name that was released in 1989. The game is a sequel to Heroes of the Lance and like it, is arcade oriented, with few role-playing video game elements. This module has also been converted into a Neverwinter Nights adventure, requiring both the Hordes of the Underdark expansion pack and the original game.

References

External links
DragonLance Series at Acaeum.com

Dragonlance adventures
Role-playing game supplements introduced in 1984